{{Infobox organization
| name                = South Atlantic Peace and Cooperation ZoneZona de Paz e Cooperação do Atlântico SulZone de Paix et de Coopération de l'Atlantique SudZona de Paz y Cooperación del Atlántico Sur
| image               = Zpcas flag.jpg
| caption             = Flag of the ZPCAS
| map                 = Map of ZPCAS member states.svg
| mcaption            = Member countries shown in blue
| type                = 
| headquarters        = Brasília, Brazil
| membership          = 24 member states
| language            = English, Portuguese, Spanish, French
| leader_title        = Secretary General
| leader_name         = H.E.Luiz Inácio Lula da Silva
| formation           = 27 October 1986
| website             = 
}}

The South Atlantic Peace and Cooperation Zone (abbreviations: ZPCAS or ZOPACAS; ; ; also called the Zone of Peace and Cooperation of the South Atlantic'') was created in 1986 through resolution A/RES/41/11 of the  U.N. general assembly on Brazil's initiative, with the aim of promoting cooperation and the maintenance of peace and security in the South Atlantic region. Particular attention was dedicated to the question of preventing the geographical proliferation of nuclear weapons and of reducing and eventually eliminating the military presence of countries from other regions.

A Declaration on the denuclearization of the South Atlantic region was adopted at a meeting of member states held in Brasilia in September 1994. The U.N. General Assembly endorsed the initiative, albeit with opposition from the United States, United Kingdom and France.

The South Atlantic itself is currently not a nuclear-weapon-free zone but all member states are currently signatories of international treaties that prohibit nuclear weapons, namely the African Nuclear Weapons Free Zone Treaty and the Treaty for the Prohibition of Nuclear Weapons in Latin America and the Caribbean. However, several Mid-Atlantic Ridge islands, the British overseas territory of Saint Helena and its dependencies Ascension Island and Tristan da Cunha, and Norway's Bouvet Island are not covered by those treaties. In addition, the Falkland Islands are not covered by these treaties as a British Overseas Territory.

Members

See also
 North Atlantic Treaty Organization
 Community of Portuguese Speaking Countries
 African Nuclear Weapons Free Zone Treaty, Treaty for the Prohibition of Nuclear Weapons in Latin America and the Caribbean
 Africa-South America Summit

References

 Address to the 6th Ministerial Meeting of the Zone for Peace and Cooperation in the South Atlantic (Dept. of Foreign Affairs of South Africa)
 United Nations General Assembly Resolution A/RES/41/11 - Zone of Peace and Cooperation of the South Atlantic
 Voting record on this resolution 41/11
 South African-Latin American Maritime Co-operation: Towards a South Atlantic RIM Community? Written by Dr. Greg Mills,  National Director, South African Institute of International Affairs, Johannesburg

External links
 Official website of the Ministry of Foreign Relations of Brazil
 Official website of the Department of Foreign Affairs of South Africa

Foreign relations of Brazil
United Nations General Assembly resolutions
Nuclear-weapon-free zones
1986 in the United Nations
Organizations established in 1986
International organisations based in Brazil